This is a list of members of the 4th Lok Sabha arranged by state or territory represented. These members of the lower house of the Indian Parliament were elected to the 4th Lok Sabha (1967 to 1971) at the 1967 Indian general election.

Andaman and Nicobar Islands

Andhra Pradesh

Assam

Bihar

Chandigarh

Dadra and Nagar Haveli

Delhi

Goa, Daman and Diu

Gujarat

Haryana

Himachal Pradesh

Jammu and Kashmir

Karnataka

Kerala

Lakshadweep

Madhya Pradesh

Madras State

Maharashtra

Manipur

Meghalaya

Mysore State

Nagaland

Odisha

Puducherry

Punjab

Rajasthan

Tamil Nadu

Tripura

Uttar Pradesh

West Bengal

References

List
4